Matsumuraeses trophiodes is a moth of the family Tortricidae first described by Edward Meyrick in 1908. It is found in Sri Lanka and Java. The species sometimes considered as a synonym of Matsumuraeses phaseoli, which is found in China and South Africa.

Its larval host plant is Glycine max.

References

Moths of Asia
Moths described in 1908